Magni Grenivík is an Icelandic sports club from the village of Grenivík, mainly known for its football team. The club has a football team currently playing in the second tier of Icelandic football also known as Inkasso-deild karla. Magni was founded in 1915 by Magnús Björnsson making it one of the oldest teams in Icelandic football history.

Stadium 

Magni play their matches at Grenivíkurvöllur but also play at Boginn in Akureyri if the pitch condition is poor as is common during the preseason.

Seating and the new facilities were installed at Grenivíkurvöllur due to their promotion to the second tier of Icelandic football. The amount of seats are approximately 360 with plenty of space around the field as well.

There is also a smaller field on the east side of the main field which is mostly used by the future stars for practice.

Statistics and Honors 
1918 Won the Cup of the Quarters

1934 Won the Football tournament of the Northerners

1972 Promotion to 3.deild karla (at the time it was called the 2. league)

1990 Won 4.deild karla

2005/2006 Promotion to 2.deild karla

2014/2015 Promotion to 2. deild karla

2016/2017 Promotion to 1.deild karla

Current squad

Staff 
As of 12 October 2019

References

External links
Magni Grenivík – Official website
Magni Grenivík FB- Official Facebook Site

Football clubs in Iceland
Association football clubs established in 1915
1915 establishments in Iceland